Condica morsa is a species of moth in the family Noctuidae (the owlet moths).

The MONA or Hodges number for Condica morsa is 9712.

References

Further reading

 
 
 

Condicinae
Articles created by Qbugbot
Moths described in 1907